The 2013 Junior Club World Cup was the 3rd Junior Club World Cup, an annual international ice hockey tournament. It took place between 25–31 August 2013 in Omsk, Russia.

The 2013 edition was hosted by Omsk, the host of the 2011 and 2012 editions of the World Cup. 8 teams participated in the tournament.

Teams

Group A

Group B

Group stage

Key
W (regulation win) – 3 pts.
OTW (overtime/shootout win) – 2 pts.
OTL (overtime/shootout loss) – 1 pt.
L (regulation loss) – 0 pts.

Group A

Group B

Play-off round

Semi-finals

7th place game

5th place game

3rd place game

Final

Final standings

Statistics

References

External links
 Official website
 World Cup on Eurohockey.com

Junior Club World Cup
Junior Club World Cup
Junior Club World Cup
International ice hockey competitions hosted by Russia
Sport in Omsk